Noisebox Records was a UK record label based in Norwich in the early and mid-1990s run by Pete Morgan. The label released over 50 albums and singles from acts such as The Lemongrowers, Navigator, Waddle, Farrah, The Joeys, Steerpike, Magoo, UXB and Crest, as well as organising gigs locally and nationally. The label went out of existence in 1998. Pete Morgan still works within the industry, he is director of 'Noisebox Digital Media' and part owner of 'Burning Shed', an online record label.

Discography

See also
 List of record labels

References

External links
 Noisebox Digital Media - homepage
 Noisebox Records @ Discogs.com
 Pete Morgan @ Burning Shed

Record labels disestablished in 1998
British independent record labels